Armondo Linus Acosta, also known as Armand Acosta and Armando Acosta (born September 23, 1938), is an American-born award-winning film director, screenwriter, cinematographer, producer and designer. He is best known for his motion picture film-in-concert Romeo.Juliet. Acosta is about to release "The Living Tableau", a stand-alone filmic recreation of Leonardo DaVinci's The Last Supper, as well as the opening sequence of Acosta's new feature film project: The Last Supper: A Divine Prophecy. "The Living Tableau" is the first time in motion picture history that Vittorio Storaro, cinematographer, Dante Ferretti, production designer and Francesca Lo Schiavo, set decorator, have worked together.

Early life and education 
Acosta was born in Bradford, Pennsylvania. The eldest of three children, his parents were popular musicians during the Big Band era: Kay Bratton, Acosta's mother, was a  jazz singer and his father, Alex Acosta, a drummer. During the first eleven years of Acosta's life, the road was home. He traveled around the country wherever his parents performed.

He began a precocious education in music, art and theater at the age of eight. Acosta went on to study at Tomlinson Technical Institute, Ringling College of Art and Design in Sarasota, Florida, and the Art Center College of Design in Los Angeles, California.

Career
Acosta  created, directed, designed and lit over 250 major international award-winning commercials for institutions, companies and organizations. Clients and assignments included Ford Motor Company, General Motors, Chrysler, NASA, MGM, ABC, CBS, NBC, Paramount Pictures, Warner Bros., Eastman Kodak, Chanel, Herman Miller, The New York World’s Fair, and Alka-Seltzer. His work is represented in the International Design Annuals and the Television Hall of Fame.

An ‘A&R’ and design consultant, Acosta created and designed numerous 33 1/3 album covers for producer Richard Bock, founder of Pacific Jazz Records (known in the 1960s as World Pacific Records).

From 1958 through 1963 Acosta learned first-hand from Roger Corman. Acosta worked with Coppola on The Young Racers as visual consultant and Battle Beyond the Sun. Learning the trade by wearing many hats, Acosta participated in various Corman film projects including The Haunted Palace.

In 1962 Acosta was appointed Filmic Designer for the Emmy nominated, avant-garde television variety show "The Lively Ones." The show, sponsored by Ford Motor Company, aired for two seasons on NBC and starred Vic Damone, directed by Barry Shear with music by Jerry Fielding.

In the early 1960s, the Vatican commissioned Acosta to create, write and design a series of 15 short feature films illustrating the Psalms. Acosta worked with Father Patrick Peyton’s Family Theater Productions.

The Psalms collection was screened in the Vatican Pavilion at the 1964 New York World’s Fair.  One of the short films, The Soldier, featuring the then young William Shatner, was screened at the 1964 Venice Film Festival. The Soldier won awards in the international film festival circuit, along with receiving industry recognition.

Armondo Linus Acosta was represented for over three decades by show business agent, Dennis Selinger of ICM London. Acosta’s long-time legal representative was Lee Steiner of Loeb & Loeb.

Acosta has served as consultant, writer and cinematographer-director. During the 1960s, he worked officially and unofficially with Hollywood producers and directors including Alfred Hitchcock, Blake Edwards, Pandro Berman, Joseph E. Levine, Vittorio De Sica, Stanley Kramer, David Lean, Vincente Minnelli, Anthony Mann, Robert Aldrich, Shirley Clarke, James B. Harris and Orson Welles.

After establishing his own company, Moonseed Productions, Acosta with his international repertory crew of devotees, started working on his first full-length motion picture in 1988 as director, writer, cinematographer and producer. The world premiere of the acclaimed Romeo.Juliet was held at the 1990 Venice Film Festival. The film is an interpretation of Shakespeare's classic love story features Serge Prokofiev's "Romeo and Juliet Ballet" performed by the London Symphony Orchestra and conducted by André Previn. The film stars Sir John Hurt (the only human character) and the British award-winning voice-over cast of Dame Maggie Smith, Vanessa Redgrave, Robert Powell, Sir Ben Kingsley, Francesca Annis, Victor Spinetti and Quentin Crisp.

Acosta is the director, mentor and founder of The Academy of Film and The Arts, an international film school and studio based in Ghent, Belgium.

In addition to completing "The Living Tableau" with Storaro, Ferretti and Lo Schiavo, Acosta's other film projects include: 
The Last Supper: A Divine Prophecy(in production), 
Shooting Stars (post-production) and Joy (pre-production).

In the year 2000, Acosta was reunited with his mentor, Roger Corman at the Flanders International Film Festival in Ghent, Belgium.

On November 14, 2009, Acosta attended the Academy of Motion Picture Arts and Sciences Governor’s Award Ball honoring Roger Corman.

Credits

Filmography (general) 
 Touch of Evil (1958), Orson Welles, director
 Two Women or La Ciociara (1960), Vittorio De Sica, director
 El Cid (1961), Anthony Mann, director
 Judgment at Nuremberg (1961), Stanley Kramer, director
 Days of Wine and Roses (1962), Blake Edwards, director
 Experiment in Terror (1962), Blake Edwards, director
 Lawrence of Arabia (1962), David Lean, director
 The Connection (1962), Shirley Clarke, director
 What Ever Happened to Baby Jane? (1962), Robert Aldrich, director
 War Hunt (1962), Denis Sanders, director
 "The Soldier" (1962), from the PSALMS
 "Wonder" (1962), from the PSALMS
 Gay Purr-ee (1962), animated film, Abe Levitow, director
 The Lord is My Shepherd (1962) from the PSALMS
 "The Escape" (1962) from the PSALMS
 The Young Racers (1963), Roger Corman, director
 The Haunted Palace (1963), Roger Corman, director
 The Birds (1963), Alfred Hitchcock, director
 It's a Mad, Mad, Mad, Mad World (1963) Stanley Kramer, director
 The Pink Panther (1963), Blake Edwards, director
 Battle Beyond the Sun (1967), Roger Corman, director

Filmography (director) 
 Romeo.Juliet (1990)
 "Shooting Stars" (post-production)
 "Joy" (pre-production)
 "The Last Supper: A Divine Prophecy" (in production)

Television 
 "Follow the Sun" (1961–1962), series, United States
 "The Lively Ones" (1962–1963), series, United States

References

External links 
 https://www.imdb.com/name/nm0010163/

1938 births
Living people
American film directors